Partecosta macandrewii is a species of sea snail, a marine gastropod mollusk in the family Terebridae, the auger snails.

Distribution
This marine species occurs in the Persian Gulf

References

External links
 Smith E.A. (1877). Descriptions of new species of Conidae and Terebridae. Annals and Magazine of Natural History. ser. 4, 19: 222–231
 Fedosov, A. E.; Malcolm, G.; Terryn, Y.; Gorson, J.; Modica, M. V.; Holford, M.; Puillandre, N. (2020). Phylogenetic classification of the family Terebridae (Neogastropoda: Conoidea). Journal of Molluscan Studies

Terebridae
Gastropods described in 1877